Piotr Kosmatko (born 22 April 1952) is a Polish sports shooter. He competed in the mixed 50 metre rifle prone event at the 1980 Summer Olympics.

References

1952 births
Living people
Polish male sport shooters
Olympic shooters of Poland
Shooters at the 1980 Summer Olympics
Sportspeople from Warsaw